Ptilotus polystachyus (common name - Prince of Wales feather) is an herb in the Amaranthaceae family.

Distribution
Ptilotus polystachyus is endemic to Australia and found in all mainland states, with the exception of Victoria.

Taxonomy
It was first described in 1829 by Charles Gaudichaud-Beaupré as Trichinium polystachyum, but was redescribed in 1868 by Ferdinand von Mueller as belonging to the genus, Ptilotus.

References

External links 

 Ptilotus polystachyus occurrence data from the Australasian Virtual Herbarium

polystachyus
Flora of Western Australia
Taxa named by Charles Gaudichaud-Beaupré
Eudicots of Western Australia
Plants described in 1829
Flora of New South Wales
Flora of Queensland
Flora of South Australia
Flora of the Northern Territory